Hawkman (Katar Hol) is a DC Comics superhero. He is the Silver Age, Bronze Age and New 52 Hawkman. Created by Gardner Fox and Joe Kubert, he first appeared in The Brave and the Bold #34 (February–March 1961). There are two versions of Katar Hol, the Silver Age/Pre-Crisis version and the post-Hawkworld/Post-Crisis version.

Publication history
The Silver Age Hawkman (Katar Hol) was first introduced in The Brave and the Bold #34 by artist Joe Kubert and writer Gardner Fox. At this time DC had already rebooted many of its characters such as the Flash and Green Lantern. Hawkman's first appearance sold well and spawned five more tryout issues in The Brave and the Bold. During these issues, he teamed up with his wife, Hawkgirl, to battle foes on earth as well as on his home planet Thanagar. 

After Hawkman had concluded his appearances in The Brave and the Bold, he starred in a side strip within Mystery in Space. He appeared in four issues of this series, and teamed up with Adam Strange in some of these adventures.

In 1964, Hawkman was given a bi-monthly solo title. Murphy Anderson took over the art for this series with Gardner Fox continuing as writer. Hawkman occasionally teamed up with The Atom and Adam Strange in his title. Together, Hawkman and Hawkgirl battled such enemies as the Matter Master, the Shadow Thief and Lion-Mane. Hawkman's comic book continued for less than five years before it was canceled at issue #27.

After declining sales forced the cancellation of his solo magazine, Hawkman teamed up with the Atom and starred in The Atom and Hawkman for seven issues. This series was canceled as well.

During the 1970s and early 1980s, Hawkman continued to appear as a member of the Justice League of America, which he had joined back in 1964. He also made regular appearances in World's Finest Comics and Detective Comics, along with a three-issue story in the pages of Showcase. It was not until the mid-1980s when Hawkman received his own title again. In 1986, DC published a four-part miniseries called, The Shadow War of Hawkman. Due to the decent sales of this series, Hawkman received another monthly solo series. It lasted seventeen issues and one Special before it, too, was cancelled.

In 1989, Timothy Truman decided to reboot the Silver Age Hawkman in a three-book series titled Hawkworld. This was the start of the post-Hawkworld version of Katar Hol. While this series was originally meant to just be a retold origin of Hawkman, it spawned yet another Hawkman series. In 1990 DC created the Hawkworld monthly series. This series had two volumes, but was eventually canceled.

During the mid 1990s–2010s Hawkman had more on-and-off series. However, none of them were of much importance. With all of the different series, Hawkman had been part of, his origin and story had become rather complicated and confusing. At the end of his 3rd series, Hawkman was physically dissolved into nothing. Eventually Hawkman came back, but this time, rather than being the alien policeman that he was in the previous series, he was Carter Hall, the reincarnated Egyptian prince. However this added even more complexity to Hawkman, and the series was canceled.

In 2011, the Silver Age Hawkman was rebooted again as part of The New 52 reboot. His new comic book was titled The Savage Hawkman. Although this Hawkman was the most simple version of the complex character, the series sold poorly and ended after twenty issues. In 2016, Hawkman returned again as part of the DC Rebirth relaunch, in a series titled The Death of Hawkman, which concluded after six issues.

A new Hawkman title, by Robert Venditti and Bryan Hitch, debuted in June 2018. However this series concerned Carter Hall the reincarnated Egyptian prince version of Hawkman rather than Katar Hol, or Silver Age version of the character.

Fictional character biography

Silver Age version
Katar Hol was the imperial prince of his home planet of Thanagar. His father was Paran Katar, renowned ornithologist and inventor.

When Katar Hol was eighteen, an alien race called the Manhawks invaded Thanagar and began looting the planet. Paran sent young Katar Hol to infiltrate their nest and bring back information on the aliens. Using this information, Paran created a hawk-like battle suit containing advanced technology like his "Nth metal". Katar used this hawk-suit and Paran's advanced weaponry to drive the Manhawks away from Thanagar.

That, however, was not the end of the problem. Some Thanagarians had learned the concept of stealing from the Manhawks. Due to the amount of crime, the Thanagarian government created a police force. In honor of Paran Katar and his achievements, the new police force began using his hawk-suit and equipment. Paran headed this new police force, named the Hawk-Police (or Wingmen), and his son became one of the first recruits.

Katar soon became one of the most skilled of the Hawk-Police. When a group called the Rainbow Robbers began committing crimes, Katar was teamed up with rookie Shayera Thal to track and apprehend the criminals. During the case, Shayera saved Katar's life, and the two soon fell in love. A few weeks later, Katar proposed to Shayera and the two got married, working together as partners-for-life in the Hawk-Police.

After ten years of marriage and in the force, the pair were sent to Earth to capture the shape-shifting Thanagarian criminal Byth. During their mission, they meet George Emmett, commissioner of the Midway City Police Department, and told him their alien origin. With Emmett's help, the pair took over his retiring brother Ed's place as museum curators. They adopt the identities as Carter and Shiera Hall. After capturing him and sending him back to Thanagar, they elected to remain on Earth to work with authorities to learn human police methods. The two acted publicly as the heroes Hawkman and Hawkgirl (later Hawkwoman).

The rest of Hawkman's supporting cast consist of Mavis Trent, museum naturalist and diorama artist who flirts with Katar; Joe Tracy, the museum's publicist; his commanding officer Andar Pul; a large red hawk named Big Red who lives in nearby Hawk Valley; and teenage orphan Charley Parker, the Golden Eagle. Katar gained a variety of unique villainous opponents such as the Shadow Thief, the Matter Master, Ira Quimby (I.Q.), Konrad Kaslak, Chac, the Raven, the Criminal Alliance of the World (or C.A.W.), Lion-Mane, Kanjar Ro, Hyathis, the Fadeaway Man, and the Gentleman Ghost.

Katar joined the Justice League of America, where he befriended the Atom. As Hawkman was a conservative, he frequently verbally sparred with his fellow Leaguer Green Arrow, a left-wing liberal.

Hol left the Justice League for a time when Thanagar was hit by the Equalizer Plague, which caused all Thanagarians to change so that their physical and mental talents, and even their heights, became the same. With the help of the JLA, he was eventually able to reverse the effects of the plague.

However, in the wake of the plague, Thanagar adopted an expansionist outlook, and went to war with the planet Rann, which orbits Alpha Centauri. This forced Katar and Shayera to choose to fight for or against their own planet, and they elected to oppose Thanagar, becoming exiles on Earth. Around this time, Shayera herself joined the JLA, and took the name Hawkwoman.

Following the truce between Thanagar and Rann, Thanagar began to secretly try to take over the Earth. Hol opposed their efforts in a furtive "secret war" for several years.

Following the events of DC's miniseries, Crisis on Infinite Earths, the histories of Earth-One and Earth-Two are merged. As a result, both Golden Age and Silver Age versions of Hawkman and Hawkgirl/Hawkwoman live on the same Earth. Initially, the Silver Age Hawkman and Hawkwoman were kept in continuity unchanged. They took Superman to Krypton (now a gas planet), briefly joined Justice League International, teamed-up with Atom, and helped Animal Man defuse a Thanagarian bomb during Invasion. However, DC reversed this decision and rebooted Hawkman continuity after the 1989 Hawkworld miniseries. Originally, Hawkworld retold the origins of the Silver Age Hawkman and Hawkwoman, but following its success, DC Comics launched a Hawkworld ongoing series set in the present, resulting in a complete reboot of Hawkman continuity. By doing so, several continuity errors regarding Hawkman and Hawkwoman's Justice League appearances needed to be fixed.

Post-Hawkworld version
Katar Hol was rebooted in 1989 in the prestige format mini-series Hawkworld by Timothy Truman. A regular ongoing series of the same name followed from 1990–1993, which was then followed up by Hawkman (vol. 3) from 1993–1996.

In this new version Katar Hol was a young police officer on the planet Thanagar, and a child of a privileged family being the son of Paran Katar. Thanagar was a planet which conquered and mined other worlds for their resources to maintain its high standard of living, and Hol realized that this was wrong. He rebelled against the system and favored the old days of Thanagar. He became a student of history and archaeology, and admired Thanagar's legendary hero Kalmoran. Hol became addicted to a recreational drug, and was manipulated by the renegade police captain Byth into killing his own father, and was sent into exile in the Isle of Chance.

During that time, he found one of the island residents in robes fashioned a pair of wings. Katar, disillusioned, killed him and took his wings. He learned the wings were meant for Hol and that the robed man had natural wings on his back. Horrified on what he has done, the brother of the man he killed helped him deal with withdrawal symptoms from his drug addictions and he made peace with himself.

When his sentence was up, Hol was sent to Downside. However, he managed to escape and uncover and defeat Byth, who had gained shape-shifting abilities. As a result, he was reinstated in the force and given a new partner, Shayera Thal - a young woman from a lower class of society.

Just after Fel Andar left Earth, Katar and Shayera were sent to Earth, where they served as goodwill ambassadors for their home planet and remained for some time fighting both human and alien criminals in places like Chicago's Netherworld. Dubbed by the press as Hawkman III, Katar and Shayera, Hawkwoman II, had a tempestuous working relationship, and eventually, Shayera broke away from Katar, who continued alone.

Katar met Carter Hall and Shiera Sanders who returned from Asgard with the rest of the Justice Society. He learns that his father came to Earth during World War II, under the alias "Perry Carter". The Golden Age Hawks, Carter and Shiera Hall, were friends with Paran, and were the inspiration of the Wingmen. In one adventure, Carter took an injured Katar to be healed by an old friend, a Cherokee shaman named Naomi ("Faraway Woman"). Katar discovers that she had known Paran Katar, his father. She and Paran fell in love, and the two eloped with the Halls serving as witnesses. Thus, Naomi is his birth mother and Katar is a hybrid Human-Thanagarian.

During the Zero Hour event, Katar Hol was merged with Carter, Shiera, and a "hawk god" creature in a new Hawkman version—a living avatar of the hawk god who adventured for a brief time, continuing to prey on criminals and deal out his own brand of fierce justice. He later went insane (tormented by the voices of all the previous hawk-avatars in his head), until he was eventually banished to Limbo by the combined skills of Arion and the Martian Manhunter.

Because of Carter Hall's return from the dead prior to Infinite Crisis, it has been stated that Katar Hol's soul dissipated from the Limbo/Realm of the Hawk God and is now deceased. Carter Hall currently inhabits a reconstructed version of Katar Hol's post-Zero Hour body, which mostly resembles Carter Hall, but with darker hair and a more barbaric frame.

The New 52 version
As part of DC's 2011 company-wide title relaunch, The New 52, Katar Hol was re-established as the DCU's Hawkman, using the name Carter Hall. His origin has yet to be fully explained since he appears to not know his alien heritage, believing himself to be human. Issue #0 explains that Katar Hol was once a proud member of the Thanagarian race, adopted son of their king Thal Provis and lover to the princess Shayera Thal. Unlike other Thanagarians, he was a pacifist; desiring to find an end to centuries of war, he convinced the king to hold a peace conference. However the Daemonites took advantage of this to spread a deadly disease that quickly destroyed all Thanagarians' wings and killed their king. The new ruler, son of Provis and Katar's adoptive brother, Corsar, came to believe that only the Nth Metal could save them, but this desire for power sacrificed hundreds of lives, which was apparently rewarded when Katar was accidentally fused with it creating a full body armor and regenerating his wings. But seeing his brother's increasing insanity, Katar refused to let the metal power be distributed, leading to fighting between them and the death of Corsar. Shayera then vows to hunt down Hawkman, also blaming him for her father's death. He runs away in a stolen ship that ends up crashing on earth. During the Rotworld storyline Animal Man travels to a post-apocalyptic future where he is attacked by a Rot-corrupted Hawkman; this version is killed by Steel, Beast Boy and Black Orchid.

Death of Hawkman 

Thanagarians attack the royal house of Rann and seemingly murder Sardath. Because of these actions, Adam Strange is not able to travel to Rann. We later find out that these actions are all a deliberate plan arranged by the antagonist. When Adam finally gets to Rann, he finds out from his wife Alanna that Thanagarians are behind the attack. Adam does not believe this because of his relationship with his JLA teammate, Katar Hol (Hawkman), who is from Thanagar. With assistance from Hawkman, Adam Strange determines that the real culprit is Despero. Using his psionic powers, Despero is able to control the minds of the citizens of Rann, Thanagar and Kalanor to incite skirmishes. His main goal is to steal the Nth metal resources and attack Earth with the Zeta crystals. A final major battle with Strange, Hawkman and Despero ensues. Hawkman sacrifices himself by expelling all the Nth metal in his body through the head of Despero. Strange destroys the Zeta crystals, causing an explosion. The aftermath shows that Adam Strange gets trapped in a wrinkle in space-time. Despero is cast to the edge of the universe along with the skeleton of Hawkman.

In the 2018 Hawkman series, Carter Hall uses a mystic artifact to reveal all of his past lives, suspecting there are gaps in his memories. Katar Hol is revealed to have been one of his prior reincarnations, despite the fact that the two had been alive simultaneously. This causes Hall to realize that he is reincarnating across space as well as time. On Dinosaur Island, Hall finds an ancient artificial cave carved into a mountain, guarded by Fetherians, a tribe of Stone Age winged humanoids. Upon entering the cavern, Hall is transported to Thanagar in the past and encounters Katar at a point in his life prior to traveling to Earth. Katar assumes Hall is his nemesis, the shape-shifting Byth, and the two Hawkmen engage in an aerial chase through the city before ending up on a gigantic statue of Thanagar's mythical hero, Kalmoran. Carter is able to get Katar to listen and convinces him of their common nature. Katar, who has been having similar visions, realizes that Hall's next clue is located on the statue.

In Justice League (vol. 3) #14, Katar was shown alive on Thanagar Prime, the new home world of the Thanagarians, disguised as a common guard. On the orders of his wife, the empress of Thanagar Prime, he attacks the Justice League. This Katar Hol was revealed to be a mindless construct created by a device called the "Absorbacon", which via reactive Nth Metal and the mental powers of a Martian elder known as the Keep, bring memories into reality.

Powers and abilities

Other versions
The Silver Age Katar Hol has made some appearances in out-of-continuity series.
 In Alex Ross' Silver Age-toned Justice, Katar Hol is a member of the Justice League; he is married to Shayera - also a member of the Justice League and works as a curator of the Midway City Museum. He is mostly referred to as "Carter", even by Shayera. In the climax of the series, he wears a suit of armor that resembles the Hawk-God.  He also appears in Secret Origins and Liberty and Justice, tabloid-sized comics also by Alex Ross.
 Katar and Shayera are featured in the Elseworlds three-part prestige format limited series Legend of the Hawkman (2000). The story takes place in the Earth-One timeline, some time after The Brave and the Bold #34. Shayera is shown wanting to return home to Thanagar while Katar has grown accustomed to life on Earth. Although this miniseries was never labeled as an Elseworlds project when originally published, it is now accepted as being one, with this story clearly based on the Silver Age versions of Hawkman and Hawkwoman during the Pre-Crisis on Infinite Earths era.
 In JLA: The Nail, Katar Hol was killed by Amazo while trying to get Green Arrow to safety. He was frequently mentioned in the sequel Another Nail.
 In The Dark Knight Strikes Again, the Hawks tried to return to Thanagar to flee from Lex Luthor's military dictatorship, only to crash in the rain forest of Costa Rica. They decided to remain in hiding. They give birth to a son and a daughter, giving them natural wings. Katar and Shayera were killed by a military strike ordered by Lex Luthor, embracing each other in their final moments. The children were brought up in the jungle ever since. They were bent on revenge against Lex. As Hawkboy, the son ultimately kills Luthor with Batman's permission, since he understands what he has been through.
 The Silver Age Hawks made a cameo appearance in Adventures in the DC Universe 80-Page Giant as Chronos II travels across time and space. He witness them in a battle against the Manhawks.
 The Silver Age Katar Hol is one of the "ghosts" in the empty "Planet Krypton" restaurant in The Kingdom: Planet Krypton #1.
 Hawkman appeared in Whatever Happened to the Man of Tomorrow? in Action Comics #583, trying to break through the barrier around the Fortress of Solitude.
 Katar and Shayera Hol appear in JLA/Avengers due to time distortions caused by Krona.
 Katar appears briefly with Shayera, setting up Thanagarian equipment, at the start of JLA: Created Equal issue #1 before the Fall.
 Katar is featured with Shayera in Scooby-Doo! Team-Up #33. He resembles the Joseph Gardner Hawkman from the DC Animated Universe. Like Carter Hall, Katar is a reincarnation of Prince Khufu, and have been reborn as Silent Knight and Nighthawk.
 Katar Hol appeared in Superman & Batman Magazine #5, wearing a uniform resembling the Post-Hawkworld version.

In other media

Television
 Katar Hol / Hawkman appears in The Superman/Aquaman Hour of Adventure, voiced by Vic Perrin. This version is a member of the Justice League who wields a wrist-mounted "power claw" instead of archaic weapons. Additionally, he has an eagle sidekick named Skreal instead of Hawkgirl, and is a scientist under the alias of "Carter Hall" instead of a museum director, with an older scientist named Professor Brown the only one who knows his true identity.
 Katar Hol / Hawkman appears in Super Friends, voiced by Jack Angel. This version is a member of the titular team.
 Katar Hol / Hawkman appears in Legends of the Superheroes, portrayed by Bill Nuckols.
 A character loosely based on Katar Hol named Hro Talak appears in the Justice League three-part episode "Starcrossed", voiced by Victor Rivers. He is a Thanagarian general as well as Hawkgirl's former commanding officer and lover. He offers to lend his troops to help the Justice League defend Earth from a Gordanian invasion. However, the Thangarians' true aim is to build a massive device called a hyperspace bypass, which will allow Thanagarian ships to reach the Gordanian homeworld, destroying all life on Earth in the process. While Talak does not desire the latter, he considers it an acceptable sacrifice for the Thanagarians to win their war with the Gordanians. However, the Thanagarians are defeated by the Justice League and forced to leave Earth. Talak later died off-screen while saving his men from a Gordanian attack before the events of the Justice League Unlimited episode "Hunter's Moon".
 Katar Hol / Hawkman appears in The Batman, voiced by Robert Patrick.
 Katar Hol / Hawkman appears in Young Justice, voiced by James Arnold Taylor. This version is a member of the Justice League.
 Katar Hol / Hawkman appears in Justice League Action, voiced by Troy Baker.

Film
 Katar Hol / Hawkman makes a cameo appearance in Justice League: The New Frontier.
 Katar Hol / Hawkman makes a non-speaking appearance in Justice League Dark: Apokolips War. He accompanies the Justice League in traveling to Apokolips to confront Darkseid, only to be converted into a cyborg Fury to serve the Apokoliptian ruler before he is freed two years later.
 Katar Hol / Hawkman makes a non-speaking appearance in Injustice.

Miscellaneous
Katar Hol / Hawkman appears in issue #9 of All-New Batman: The Brave and the Bold.

References

External links
 A Comprehensive index of Katar Hol's appearances through the mid-1980s
 
 
 
 Cosmic Teams: Hawkman and Hawkwoman
 Hawkman (1961) at Don Markstein's Toonopedia

Characters created by Gardner Fox
Characters created by Joe Kubert
Characters created by Timothy Truman
Comics characters introduced in 1961
Comics characters introduced in 1989
DC Comics aliens
DC Comics characters with superhuman strength
DC Comics characters with accelerated healing
DC Comics extraterrestrial superheroes
DC Comics male superheroes
DC Comics hybrids
DC Comics police officers
Fictional archaeologists
Fictional princes
Fictional extraterrestrial–human hybrids in comics
Wingmen of Thanagar
Hawkman